Holy Resurrection Church may refer to:

 Holy Resurrection Church (Kodiak, Alaska), a Russian Orthodox church located in Kodiak, Alaska, USA
 Holy Resurrection Church (Belkofski, Alaska), a historic Russian Orthodox church, in Belkofski, Alaska, USA
 Holy Resurrection Church, Mborje, a Cultural Monument of Albania, in Mborje, Korçë County

See also 
 Church of the Resurrection (disambiguation)
 Holy Resurrection Cathedral